Donald Falshaw was a British-Indian civil servant and judge. He was an Indian Civil Service officer.

Life 
He was born in Morecambe, Lancashire, but lived the major part of his life in British India.

He was born in 1905.

He died in 1984.

Education 
He graduated with a law degree and began his legal practice in India, eventually becoming a judge of the High Court.

Career 
He belonged to the Indian Civil Service batch of 1928 and became the first Chief Justice of the Punjab High Court in 1966.

On 15 May 1966, he became the last British judge to have served in India as the same day he sailed for the United Kingdom. This momentous occasion was reported on by the New York Times.

References

External links
 Punjab and Haryana High Court
 My memories of Punjab and Haryana High Court

1905 births
1984 deaths
20th-century Indian judges
Chief justices of India
20th-century Indian lawyers
British emigrants to India